Hans Furler (5 June 1904 – 29 June 1975) was a German christian-democrat politician. He was the president of the European Parliament (or, more precisely, precursors of the European Parliament) from 1956 to 1958 and from 1960 to 1962.

Early life

Furler was born in Lahr in the Baden portion of the Black Forest. After graduating from Lahr grammar school, Furler studied law in Freiburg in Breisgau, Berlin and Heidelberg. In 1925 he passed his first state examination and in 1928 he earned his doctorate with a thesis on "The Police's emergency measures and the state's obligation to compensate".

In December 1928, he passed the assessor's examination and first worked as an advocate in Pforzheim. Since 1930 he also lectured in patent law.

In 1932, he habilitated at Technical University Karlsruhe. In 1940, the University appointed him extraordinary professor for industrial property and copyright.

From 1945 to 1948, he worked as the lawyer of a paper factory owned by his in-laws. In 1948 he opened a new law firm in Freiburg.

After 1950, he lectured at the Albert-Ludwigs-University in Freiburg.

German politics

In 1952, Furler joined the Christian-Democratic Union and was soon elected chairman of the economic council of the party's Baden branch.

Furler was a member of the Bundestag from 1953 until 1972, representing the constituency of Offenburg. Until 1957, he was vice chairman of the committee for industrial property and copyright, in 1957 he was briefly chairman of the special committee "common market/EURATOM". From 1959 to 1960 he was chairman of the committee of foreign affairs.

European politics

From 1955 to 1973, he also was a member of the precursors to the European Parliament, first of the Common Assembly of the European Coal and Steel Community (1955–1958) and then of the European Parliamentary Assembly of the European Communities (1958–1973). He served as president of these bodies from 1956 to 1958 and from 1960 to 1962 and as vice president from 1962 to 1973.

From 1958 to 1966, he was President of the German Council of the European Movement.

Death

Furler died on 29 June 1975 in Achern.

Selected works

Das polizeiliche Notrecht und die Entschädigungspflicht des Staates, Diss.jur., Heidelberg 1928
"Parlamente über den Nationen. Entwicklung, Zustand und Aussichten in Europa", in: Die Politische Meinung, 1957, Heft 11, pp. 17–28.
Reden und Aufsätze 1953–1957 (undated)
Im neuen Europa. Erlebnisse und Erfahrungen im Europäischen Parlament, Frankfurt/Main 1963

Further reading

Horst Ferdinand, Adolf Kohler. Für Europa. Hans Furlers Lebensweg. Bonn 1977.
Claudia Philipp. "Hans Furler – Ein Europäer der ersten Stunde", in: Die Osterweiterung der EU. Stuttgart 2004.
Georg Lutz et al. Europa – eine Vision wird Wirklichkeit. Hans Furler 1904–1975. Oberkirch, 2004

1904 births
1975 deaths
People from Lahr
People from the Grand Duchy of Baden
Members of the German Burschenschaft
Christian Democratic Union of Germany politicians
Presidents of the European Parliament
Grand Crosses 1st class of the Order of Merit of the Federal Republic of Germany
MEPs for Germany 1958–1979
Sturmabteilung personnel
Nazi Party members